Donieber Alexander Marangon (born 22 October 1979), known as Doni, is a Brazilian former professional footballer who played as a goalkeeper.

Doni is the elder brother of João Paulo Fernando Marangon. Doni also holds an Italian passport. His parental family came from Veneto and his grandmother came from Mantua.

Club career

Roma

Doni joined Italian Serie A club Roma on 30 August 2005 from Juventude, after Roma paid his buy-out clause of approximately US$18,000. He signed a 1+3 year contract worth €300,000 in gross in the first year.

With Roma, Doni at first was blocked from first team action by Italian u-21 international Gianluca Curci and was restricted to UEFA Cup games. After impressing in Coppa Italia competition, however, he eventually replaced Curci in goal for Serie A games.

His contract was renewed on 13 April 2006, now worth €1.25 million a season (in gross). In his second season with Roma, he became one of the best goalkeepers of the Serie A. He won the Coppa Italia twice in 2007 and 2008, and also finished as the runner-up of Serie A in 2007 and 2008.

On 11 April 2007, Doni conceded seven goals in a UEFA Champions League tie against Manchester United, with the game ending 7–1. The following season the two teams met again, but Doni was injured.

In May 2008, his contract was extended to June 2012. He would have earned a gross annual salary of about €4 million in average (from €3.8M in the first year to €4.3M in the last year)

In the second half of the 2008–09 season, he lost his place to Artur after a 1–4 loss to Juventus on 21 March. He continued for the next two matches to be named to the matchday squad but was not starting nor available for selection on the substitutes' bench. He then trained separately with injured players and visited the doctor for his knee in April 2009.

In the 2009–10 season, the club continued to use Artur and then Júlio Sérgio as first-choice goalkeeper, despite employed Claudio Ranieri to replace Luciano Spalletti. Doni was recovering from injury. In October 2009, he returned to the team for the match against AC Milan on 18 October, but soon lost his place again to Júlio Sérgio.

After Vincenzo Montella replaced Ranieri as head coach in February 2011, Doni returned to starting XI in the second match in-charged by Montella, a 2–2 draw with Parma on 27 February.

Liverpool
Doni signed for Premier League club Liverpool on 15 July 2011 on free transfer. He was expected to serve as second-choice goalkeeper behind Pepe Reina. As part of the deal, Roma paid Doni €1.5 million net of tax, roughly covering the wage difference between Roma and Liverpool's deal. Due to Reina's red card against Newcastle United in April 2012, Doni won a place in the starting lineup, becoming the first goalkeeper other than Reina to play in a Premier League match for Liverpool since Daniele Padelli on 13 May 2007.

Doni made his Premier League debut for Liverpool on 7 April 2012 in a 1–1 draw against Aston Villa at Anfield. In his next match, on 10 April, he received a red card and conceded a penalty against Blackburn Rovers. He subsequently received a suspension, missing the FA cup semi-final at Wembley v Everton as a consequence. Doni would play his second full competitive 90 minutes in a 1–0 defeat to Fulham at Anfield. Doni made his fourth league appearance on the final day of the season, a 1–0 defeat to Swansea City. In his first season at Anfield, Doni made a total of four appearances.

In the summer of 2012, new manager Brendan Rodgers allowed Doni to return to Brazil temporarily on personal leave. Although he was still included in Liverpool's squad for the 2012–13 season, Due to this personal leave he missed a chance to start while first choice goalkeeper Pepe Reina was injured; Brad Jones played instead.

It was finally announced, upon leaving Liverpool, that Doni had suffered a heart attack during a routine medical in the summer of 2012. Doni explained that he was unconscious for 25 seconds and almost died. He was advised by professionals to never play football again.

Botafogo
On 31 January 2013, Doni joined Brazilian side Botafogo-SP (the club he started his career with) from Liverpool after not featuring in the team's starting XI since the final day of the 2011–12 season. On 12 August 2013, he retired from playing football due to heart problems.

International career
Doni earned his first cap with the Brazil national team against Turkey in Dortmund on 5 June 2007.

At the 2007 Copa América, he was selected as Brazil's first-choice goalkeeper moments before their first match against Mexico, replacing Helton. His play in the tournament included two penalty saves in penalty kicks against Uruguay in the semi-finals, which sent Brazil to the final. Brazil won the tournament with a 3–0 win over Argentina.

He was included in the preliminary squad for the 2008 Summer Olympics, but eventually did not get a place in the final list by coach Dunga.

In May 2010 he was named in Dunga’s final 23 man squad for the 2010 FIFA World Cup in South Africa.

He retired from international football on 1 February 2013 due to his previous cardiac problems.

Career statistics

Club
Source:

Honours
Corinthians
Copa do Brasil: 2002

Roma
Coppa Italia: 2006–07, 2007–08
Supercoppa Italiana: 2007

Liverpool
Football League Cup: 2011–12
FA Cup runner-up: 2011-12

Brazil
Copa América: 2007

References

External links

LFC History Profile

1979 births
Living people
Footballers from São Paulo (state)
Brazilian footballers
Brazil international footballers
Association football goalkeepers
Botafogo Futebol Clube (SP) players
Sport Club Corinthians Paulista players
Santos FC players
Cruzeiro Esporte Clube players
Esporte Clube Juventude players
A.S. Roma players
Liverpool F.C. players
Campeonato Brasileiro Série A players
Serie A players
Premier League players
2007 Copa América players
2010 FIFA World Cup players
Copa América-winning players
Brazilian expatriate footballers
Expatriate footballers in England
Expatriate footballers in Italy
Brazilian expatriate sportspeople in Italy
Brazilian expatriate sportspeople in England
Brazilian people of Italian descent
Brazilian emigrants to Italy
Citizens of Italy through descent
Brazilian people of Lombard descent
People of Venetian descent